James Edgar (born July 22, 1946) is an American politician who was the 38th governor of Illinois from 1991 to 1999. A moderate Republican,  he also served as a member of the Illinois House of Representatives from 1976 to 1979 and as Illinois Secretary of State from 1981 to 1991.

Early life and education 
Edgar was born in Vinita, Oklahoma, in 1946 to Cecil and Betty Edgar and grew up in Charleston, Illinois.

Edgar's parents were Democrats. He had an interest in politics from a young age.

In 1953, Edgar's father Cecil was killed in an automobile accident.

He attended Eastern Illinois University, where he earned a bachelor's degree in history in 1968 and served as student body president.

Despite his mother's wish for him to attend law school instead, Edgar was a legislative intern for Illinois Senate Republican leader W. Russell Arrington and later worked for House Speaker W. Robert Blair.

Pre-governorship

Illinois House of Representatives
In 1974, Edgar ran unsuccessfully in the Republican nomination for state representative from the 53rd district, coming in third place.  After the campaign, Edgar worked as an insurance and cosmetics salesperson and also for the National Conference of State Legislatures in Denver.

He ran for the same seat again two years later in 1976, winning, and was re-elected in 1978.

Illinois Secretary of State
In April 1979, Edgar resigned his state House seat to accept an appointment from Governor Jim Thompson as his legislative liaison. In early 1981, when then-Secretary of State Alan Dixon moved to the U.S. Senate, Thompson named Edgar to fill the vacancy. He won the office on his own in 1982 and 1986 and served until 1991.

As secretary of state, Edgar toughened drunk driving penalties and instituted mandatory automobile insurance for Illinois motorists.

Governor of Illinois 

Edgar was a popular governor, buoyed by a strong economy during his two terms.

While pro-choice, Edgar signed into law the Parental Notification of Abortion Act.

On August 20, 1997, Edgar announced he would retire from politics at the end of his second term. If he sought a third term, he was seen as likely to win it. He was also encouraged by Republican officials to run for U.S. Senate that year, which he also declined to do.

Edgar supported his Secretary of State George Ryan to succeed him. Ryan was elected governor in 1998.

Elections 

When longtime Governor Thompson declined to seek re-election in 1990, Edgar was the frontrunner for the Republican nomination to succeed him. He defeated conservative businessman Steven Baer in the primary and Democrat Neil Hartigan in the general election. 

In the general election, which Edgar won by just 1.6%, he focused on fiscal responsibility and was criticized for his support of making a 20% income tax increase permanent. He also struggled to overcome a general sense of a desire for change among the electorate.

In 1994, Edgar easily defeated Democratic comptroller Dawn Clark Netsch to win re-election.

MSI Scrutiny 
During his second term, the relationship between his re-election campaign and Management Systems of Illinois (MSI) came under federal scrutiny. MSI, Edgar's largest campaign contributor, was granted a contract that cost an estimated $20 million in overcharges. Edgar was never accused of wrongdoing, but he testified twice, once in court and once by videotape, becoming the first sitting Illinois governor to take the witness stand in a criminal case in 75 years. In those appearances, the governor insisted political donations played no role in who received state contracts.  Convictions were obtained against Management Services of Illinois; Michael Martin, who had been a partner of Management Services of Illinois; and Ronald Lowder, who had been a state welfare administrator and later worked for Management Services of Illinois.

"Edgar Ramp"
Prior to 1981, the State of Illinois funded pensions on an "as-you-go" basis, making benefit payouts as they came due, with employee contributions and investment income funding a reserve to cover future payouts. This approach was stopped in 1982 due to strains on the Illinois budget, and state contributions remained flat between 1982 and 1995, resulting in underfunding of pensions by approximately $20 billion. To address this shortfall, the Illinois legislature, in 1994, passed and then-Governor Edgar signed Public Act 88-593, which set payments by the State of Illinois into the pension funds at only 90 percent of liabilities, stretched this funding level over 50 years until 2045, and back-loaded payments with a 15-year ramp. The underfunding of pension reserves over the first fifteen years was not fiscally sound, and was the major cause of a large gap between the State's obligations to pay pension benefits and the funds available to pay those benefits. As Governor, Edgar signed the pension legislation into law, and for this reason, the initial underfunding of pensions became known as the "Edgar Ramp." The US Federal Securities and Exchange Commission described this analysis in a report.

Post-governorship

Edgar is a distinguished fellow of the Institute of Government & Public Affairs at the University of Illinois Urbana-Champaign.

In 1999, Edgar was elected a fellow of the National Academy of Public Administration.

Edgar was named the honorary chairman of the Ronald Reagan Centennial Celebration at Eureka College, President Reagan's alma mater. To open the Reagan Centennial year in January 2011, Governor Edgar delivered the keynote speech at the concluding dinner of the "Reagan and the Midwest" academic conference held at Eureka College. In September 2011, Edgar helped dedicate the Mark R. Shenkman Reagan Research Center housed in the Eureka College library.

As former chairman of the board of the Abraham Lincoln Presidential Library Foundation, Edgar underwrote the costs of the traveling trophy for the annual Lincoln Bowl tradition started in 2012. The Lincoln Bowl celebrates the Lincoln connection with Knox College and Eureka College, two Illinois colleges where Lincoln spoke, and is awarded to the winning team each time the two schools play each other in football.

In July 2016, the Chicago Sun-Times reported that Illinois Financing Partners, a firm for which Edgar served as chairman, won approval by the state to advance money to state vendors who had been waiting for payments by the state. In turn, the firm would get to keep late payment fees when Illinois finally pays.

Edgar was inducted as a Laureate of The Lincoln Academy of Illinois and awarded the Order of Lincoln (the State's highest honor) by the Governor of Illinois in 1999 in the area of Government.

He is a resident fellow at the John F. Kennedy School of Government at Harvard University.

Political opinions 
A moderate Republican, Edgar supports abortion.

In February 2008, Edgar endorsed Republican Senator John McCain of Arizona for President of the United States.

Edgar supported Mitt Romney in 2012. When Donald Trump won the Republican nomination in 2016, Edgar publicly announced that he would not be voting for the candidate. After the President's second nomination, Edgar, along with other Illinois GOP moderates, announced their support of former United States Vice President and Democratic challenger Joe Biden. Edgar told Peoria-area newspaper Peoria Journal Star, "I have been very disappointed. We’ve had chaos for four years we didn’t need to have. I mean, there’s always going to be some turmoil, but he stirs it up. He bullies. You can’t believe what he says because he’ll do the different thing the next day. ... He’s bungled the virus, there’s no doubt about that. He continued to stir up division in the country, (when) a president should be trying to bring people together. I mean, the list goes on and on."

In the spring of 2016, Edgar said that he believed Governor Bruce Rauner should sign the Democratic budget and support the Democratic pension plan. Edgar pushed for a pension bill to save $15 billion back in 1994. "We had a time bomb in our retirement system that was going to go off in the first part of the 21st century," Edgar told The State Journal-Register in 1994. "This legislation defuses that time bomb." The legislature passed Edgar's bill unanimously.

Personal life 
Edgar is married to Brenda Smith Edgar. They have two children, Brad and Elizabeth.

In 1994, Edgar underwent emergency quadruple bypass surgery and was hospitalized in 1998 for chest pains.

References

External links
 Gov. Edgar reacts to the allegations against Gov. Rod Blagojevich – link to speech, op-ed, and interview about the 2008–2009 Blagojevich scandal; from the University of Illinois Institute of Government and Public Affairs
 

|-

|-

|-

1946 births
Living people
People from Vinita, Oklahoma
People from Charleston, Illinois
Wabash College alumni
Eastern Illinois University alumni
Republican Party members of the Illinois House of Representatives
Secretaries of State of Illinois
Republican Party governors of Illinois